"" (literally: Dearest Jesus, we are here) is a Lutheran hymn with text written by Tobias Clausnitzer in 1663, and a hymn tune, Zahn No. 3498b, based on a 1664 melody by Johann Rudolph Ahle (Zahn No. 3498a). A prayer for illumination, it is suitable for the opening of a church service and to be sung before a sermon. The song is part of the Protestant hymnal Evangelisches Gesangbuch as EG 161. It is also part of the Catholic hymnal Gotteslob as GL 149. It is popular also in English translations such as "Blessed Jesus, at your word" by Catherine Winkworth.

History 
Clausnitzer wrote the text "" in 1663, as a prayer for illumination. It was often sung before a sermon in a church service, and also at the beginning of school lessons.

The hymn is part of the German Protestant hymnal Evangelisches Gesangbuch, as EG 161.  It is part of the German Catholic hymnal Gotteslob of 2013, as GL 149 in the section Eröffnung (Opening), and of many other hymnals and songbooks. The song is published in more than 100 hymnals. Catherine Winkworth translated it as "Blessed Jesus, at your word". Other hymns sung to the same tune are "Blessed Jesus, here we stand" and "Word of God, Come Down on Earth".

Text, melody and settings 
"" is in three stanzas of six lines each. The text is given as in GL 149, and in Winkworth's translation:

Musical settings 
The hymn appears in the vocal and organ works of Johann Sebastian Bach. He harmonised the slightly simplified tune as a four part chorale (BWV 373, transcribed below) and wrote two chorale preludes of the same tune for organ (BWV 730, and BWV 731) The chorale prelude BWV 633 to the same hymn and its embellished variant BWV 634 form part of the Orgelbüchlein.

Sigfrid Karg-Elert composed a chorale prelude as one of his 66 Chorale improvisations for organ, Op. 65, published in 1909.

Melody 
The version of the melody used in recent German hymnals is slightly different from the one employed in Bach's settings.

References

Cited sources

External links 
 
 Gotteslob / Liedertexte (in German)

17th-century hymns in German
1663 works
Lutheran hymns